Donald MacDonald (1886 – 7 December 1970) was a Canadian politician from the province of Saskatchewan. He represented Meadow Lake on the Legislative Assembly of Saskatchewan as a Liberal from 1934 to 1944.

Early life 
MacDonald was born in Listowel, Ontario. In 1916 he enlisted in the Lord Strathcona's Horse.

References 

1886 births
1970 deaths
Canadian Expeditionary Force soldiers
Saskatchewan Liberal Party MLAs
People from Meadow Lake, Saskatchewan
Lord Strathcona's Horse soldiers
Canadian military personnel from Ontario
Canadian military personnel of World War I